Kovača Vas is a settlement in the hills just north of Slovenska Bistrica in northeastern Slovenia. The area is part of the traditional region of Styria. It is now included with the rest of the Municipality of Slovenska Bistrica in the Drava Statistical Region.

A small church in the settlement is dedicated to Saint Roch and belongs to the Parish of Slovenska Bistrica. It was built in 1922.

References

External links
Kovača Vas at Geopedia

Populated places in the Municipality of Slovenska Bistrica